Judas Kiss is a 1998 American crime thriller film that starred Alan Rickman, Emma Thompson, Roscoe Lee Browne, Carla Gugino, Simon Baker-Denny, Gil Bellows, Richard Riehle, and Til Schweiger. It was directed by Sebastian Gutierrez.

The film premiered at the 1998 Toronto International Film Festival and won the Critics Award at the 1999 Cognac Festival du Film Policier.

Plot
Coco Chavez and Junior Armstrong are two small-time criminals who make money at blackmail and sex scams. They attempt to break into the big time by kidnapping a computer genius and holding him for a $4 million ransom. To help them, they enlist Lizard Browning and Ruben Rubenbauer who provide firepower and technology. However, during the kidnapping, they accidentally kill the young wife of Louisiana Senator Hornbeck.

Racked by guilt, Coco and the group are pursued by veteran Federal Bureau of Investigation agent Sadie Hawkins and grizzled New Orleans detective David Friedman. The two combative officers enjoy showing up one another during their investigation, as well as commiserate about their jobs and personal foibles. Coco and Junior also have to deal with henchmen hired by the Senator to get revenge on the group.

As the plot unfolds, it appears that the murder may not have been entirely accidental. Detective Friedman's suspicions are raised when Senator Hornbeck threatens the detectives instead of offering assistance. On the cusp of getting away with a nearly flawless crime, the group faces betrayal from within.

Cast
Alan Rickman as Detective David Friedman
Emma Thompson as FBI Agent Sadie Hawkins
Roscoe Lee Browne as Chief Bleeker
Carla Gugino as Coco Chavez
Gil Bellows as Lizard Browning
Simon Baker-Denny as Junior Armstrong
Til Schweiger as Ruben Rubenbauer
Richard Riehle as Security Guard
Philip Baker Hall as Pobby Malavero
Hal Holbrook as Senator Rupert Hornbeck
Joey Slotnick as Walters
Jack Conley as Detective Matty Grimes
Lisa Eichhorn as Mary Ellen Floyd

Production
The movie was produced by Bandeira Entertainment. The movie was filmed in Los Angeles, California and on location in New Orleans, Louisiana.

Reception
On review aggregator website Rotten Tomatoes, the film holds an approval rating of 43% based on 7 reviews, with an average rating of 5.92/10.

Michael Dequina from Movie Report.com said, "The usual set of twists and double-crosses ensue, with nothing all-too-surprising (or funny; the attempts at humor mostly fall flat) to distinguish it from the winding paths of other similar films".

Derek Elley of Variety wrote "Judas Kiss is a wannabe film noir-cum-policier that's badly in need of a rewrite by James Ellroy".

Awards and nominations
Cognac Festival du Film Policier
Won: Critics Award (Sebastian Gutierrez)

Paris Film Festival
Nominated: Grand Prix (Sebastian Gutierrez)

Home video
The movie was distributed to home video on both VHS and DVD formats on September 21, 1999 by Sony Pictures. Both home video formats have a runtime of 98 minutes.

References

External links

1998 crime drama films
1998 directorial debut films
Films set in Louisiana
Films shot in New Orleans
American neo-noir films
American police detective films
Films directed by Sebastian Gutierrez
Girls with guns films
American crime drama films
Films produced by Beau Flynn
Films scored by Christopher Young
1990s English-language films
1990s American films